Sodium chloroacetate is the organic compound with the formula CH2ClCO2Na.  A white, water-soluble solid, it is the sodium salt of chloroacetic acid. Many of its uses are similar to those of the parent acid.  It is prepared by treating chloroacetic acid with sodium carbonate.

Uses
Chloroacetate is a good alkylating agent, serving as a reagent for affixing the -CH2CO2− group to a wide variety of even weak nucleophiles.

In terms of practical, commercial uses, it is used to convert cellulose to cellulose acetate.  It is a precursor to many herbicides dimethoate and benazoline (the salt itself is also used as a contact herbicide). It is a precursor to thioglycolic acid by reaction with sodium hydrosulfide.  Reaction with cyanide salts gives cyanoacetate NCCH2CO2Na.  Cyanoacetate is a precursor to malonic acid.

Sodium chloroacetate is a common laboratory reagent in organic chemistry as illustrated by many entries in the book series Organic Syntheses. With bifunctional nucleophiles, sodium chloroacetate is a precursor to heterocycles.

Reaction with sodium nitrite give nitroacetic acid. With sodium ethoxide it gives ethoxyacetate. With ethyl acetoacetate ethyl acetosuccinate is produced.

Hydrolysis gives glycolic acid.

References

Acetates
Organochlorides
Organic sodium salts